The 1946 Varto–Hınıs earthquake occurred at 05:12:46 local time on 31 May. The earthquake had an estimated moment magnitude of 5.9 and a maximum felt intensity of VIII (Severe) on the Mercalli intensity scale, causing between 800 and 1,300 casualties.

See also
 List of earthquakes in 1946
 List of earthquakes in Turkey

References

External links

1946 Varto
1946 earthquakes
1946 in Turkey
History of Erzurum Province
History of Muş Province
May 1946 events in Europe
1946 disasters in Turkey